Viemo, also known as Vige, Vigué, Vigye, is a language of Burkina Faso. It may be a member of the Gur language, but it is of uncertain affiliation within the Niger-Congo languages. It is spoken in Karangasso-Vigué Department and in neighbouring provinces. 

The largest villages are Klesso, Dérégouan, Dan, and Karangasso-Vigué. Speakers are called Vigué by Jula speakers.

References

Gur languages
Languages of Burkina Faso